Jarrod Garlett (born 3 May 1996) is a former professional Australian rules footballer who played for the Gold Coast Football Club and Carlton Football Club in the Australian Football League (AFL).

Garlett played for the South Fremantle Football Club in the West Australian Football League (WAFL) before being drafted with pick 15 in the 2014 AFL draft. He made his AFL debut round 1 of the 2015 AFL season. In his third game he was nominated for the 2015 AFL Goal of the Year after running from the backline to kick a long goal. At the conclusion of the 2016 season, he left Gold Coast to return home to Western Australia due to family reasons.

Garlett is a second cousin of 's Jeff Garlett and a first cousin of 's 2013 draftee Dayle Garlett.

References

External links

WAFL playing statistics
 

Living people
1996 births
Gold Coast Football Club players
South Fremantle Football Club players
Australian rules footballers from Western Australia
Indigenous Australian players of Australian rules football
Carlton Football Club players
Preston Football Club (VFA) players
West Coast Eagles (WAFL) players